Juan Martín Bouvier (born 2 February 1992) is an Argentine professional footballer who plays as a centre-back for Club Luján.

Career
Bouvier started his career with Huracán. His two appearances for the club arrived in the 2012–13 Primera B Nacional campaign, appearing for the full duration of fixtures in October 2012 against Nueva Chicago and Olimpo. He remained for three further seasons without featuring. In January 2015, Bouvier was loaned to Deportivo Armenio. However, he returned to his parent club in February, prior to spending the rest of 2015 on loan with Torneo Federal A's San Lorenzo de Alem. Thirty appearances followed; twenty-nine starts. He received his first red card in April versus Andino.

In January 2016, Bouvier completed a move to Deportivo Español of Primera B Metropolitana. He scored his first senior goal versus Talleres on 28 October 2017. He remained until June 2019, having made forty-four appearances and scored three goals. After departing, the centre-back moved across the division to UAI Urquiza.

Career statistics
.

References

External links

1992 births
Living people
People from Luján, Buenos Aires
Argentine footballers
Argentine people of French descent
Association football defenders
Primera Nacional players
Torneo Federal A players
Primera B Metropolitana players
Club Atlético Huracán footballers
Deportivo Armenio footballers
Deportivo Español footballers
UAI Urquiza players
Club Luján footballers
Sportspeople from Buenos Aires Province